Ben Powers (born October 29, 1996) is an American football offensive guard for the Denver Broncos of the National Football League (NFL). He played college football at Oklahoma.

High school
Powers attended high school in Wichita, Kansas at Kapaun Mt. Carmel Catholic High School.  He got varsity letters in football and wrestling and finished second in the state wrestling finals. As a junior in high school, Powers, already 6 ft 4ins tall and weighed 280 pounds, played both on the offensive line and defensive line. After his senior football season, Powers received no scholarship from any major college or university.

College career 
After one year at Butler Community College, Powers enrolled at the University of Oklahoma. Following the 2018 season, Powers was named a consensus first-team All-American.

Professional career

Baltimore Ravens
The Baltimore Ravens selected Powers with the 123rd overall pick in the fourth round of the 2019 NFL Draft. After making the active roster, he was placed on the inactive list for the first 6 weeks of his rookie season before making his debut in Week 17, playing the majority of snaps at right guard in the Ravens' win over the Pittsburgh Steelers.

After beginning the 2020 season as a backup, he was named the starting right guard midseason due to injuries. He was the primary left guard in 2021, and was the full-time starter in 2022.

Denver Broncos
On March 16, 2023, Powers signed a four-year, $51.5 million contract with the Denver Broncos.

References

1996 births
Living people
Players of American football from Wichita, Kansas
American football offensive guards
Butler Grizzlies football players
Oklahoma Sooners football players
Baltimore Ravens players
All-American college football players
Denver Broncos players